Mario Corti was an early Italian Nordic combined skier and sports official.

Corti was the first Italian champion of Nordic combined and cross-country skiing, He was member of the 1901 founded Ski Club Torino, where he was the fourth president from 1920 to 1936. During this period he invented the legendary Trofeo Mezzalama. Meanwhile, he was also president of the Federazione Italiana dello Sci from 1922 to 1924.

Selected results 
 1909:
 1st, Italian championships of Nordic combined
 1st, Italian men's championships of cross-country skiing, 18 km
 2nd, Italian championships of ski jumping
 1910:
 1st, Italian championships of Nordic combined
 1st, Italian championships of ski jumping

References 

19th-century births
20th-century deaths
Italian male cross-country skiers
Italian male Nordic combined skiers
Italian male ski jumpers
Italian male ski mountaineers
Italian referees and umpires
Sportspeople from the Metropolitan City of Turin